Gateway Towers is a residential complex under construction in Mumbai, India. It will have 6 residential towers ranging from 31 to 41 stories.

Gateway Towers has been designed by Callison. It is located in the northeastern suburb of Mulund. The property is built on an 8.5 acre area.

References

External links
Official website

Buildings and structures under construction in India
Residential skyscrapers in Mumbai